Julia Boyd is a British non-fiction author.

The Washington Post called Travellers in the Third Reich "riveting". It was awarded the 2018 Los Angeles Times Book Prize for History.

The Times called A Village in the Third Reich a "fascinating deep dive into daily life", and The Scotsman, "a masterpiece of historical non-fiction".

She was married to the late Sir John Boyd, a diplomat, and later Master of Churchill College, Cambridge. She lives in London.

Publications
The Story of Furniture, Hamlyn, 1975
Hannah Riddell: An Englishwoman in Japan, Tuttle, 1995
The Excellent Doctor Blackwell: The Life of the First Woman Physician, Sutton, 2005
A Dance with the Dragon: The Vanished World of Peking’s Foreign Colony, I.B. Tauris, 2012
Travellers in the Third Reich: The Rise of Fascism through the Eyes of Everyday People, Pegasus, 2018
A Village in the Third Reich: How Ordinary Lives were Transformed by the Rise of Fascism, 2022

References

Living people
21st-century British writers
British non-fiction writers
Year of birth missing (living people)